Ela Nala Milić (born 2006) is a Slovenian tennis player.

Milić made her WTA main-draw debut at the 2021 Zavarovalnica Sava Portorož after receiving a wildcard for the doubles main draw.

Milić is the daughter of former basketball player Marko Milič and the granddaughter of former shot putter Vladimir Milić.

References

External links
 
 

2006 births
Living people
Slovenian female tennis players
Slovenian people of Serbian descent